Carrie Beatrice Halsell Ward (1903–1989) was Oregon State University's first African-American graduate. She graduated in 1926, with a Bachelor of Science in Commerce.

Early life 
Halsell was born on October 26, 1903, in Boulder, Colorado to William and Bessie Halsell, the third of six children. The family moved to Salem, Oregon around 1912 where William worked various jobs including janitor, laborer, and farmer and by 1921 he was a shopkeeper on State Street.

In high school Halsell was on the honor roll and participated in glee club, girls' club, girls' reserve, commercial club, and typewriting contests; she received her high school diploma from Salem High School in Salem, Oregon, in 1921.

Later life

Oregon 
After Halsell got her degree from Oregon Agricultural College (now Oregon State University) in 1926, she moved to Portland, where her family had moved, and worked as a housekeeper for the Meier & Frank department store, one of the few employment opportunities for a black woman in the area. In 1927 The Advocate newspaper printed that Halsell was vacationing in Corvallis for two weeks in July.

Virginia 
In September 1927 Halsell took a position at Virginia Normal and Industrial Institute (now Virginia State University), as a stenographer, assistant to the registrar, and later as an instructor in business. While at Virginia Normal she was an establishing member of the Alpha Eta chapter of Delta Sigma Theta sorority, a historic black sorority.

South Carolina 
In 1945 Halsell took a position at South Carolina State University, where her husband, Louis Morris Ward, worked as a faculty member in Business Administration.  She obtained a Master's in Business Administration from New York University in 1949 by going to school in the summers.

She died in July 1989, at the age of 85 in Orangeburg, South Carolina.

Legacy 

In 2002 Oregon State University named a residence hall in her honor. In 2016 Salem High School posthumously gave her an achievement award as the first African American to graduate from Salem High School.

References

External links 

Lonnie B. Harris Black Cultural Center Records, 1966-2011

1903 births
1989 deaths
People from Boulder, Colorado
People from Salem, Oregon
Oregon State University alumni
New York University alumni
20th-century African-American people
People from Colorado
African-American history of Oregon
African-American history in Portland, Oregon
Delta Sigma Theta members
South Carolina State University faculty